Franz Liszt's Transcendental Étude No. 6 in G minor "Vision" is the sixth of his twelve Transcendental Études. It is a study of the extensions of the hand, hands moving in opposite directions, arpeggiated double notes, and tremolos.

It is one of the less difficult études out of Liszt's 12 Transcendental Études, though the beginning of the piece can be quite troublesome if it is played as directed: completely with the left hand (linked hand in the second edition [Dover]). It would require large stretches and dexterous leaps if done so.

Visual image 
The visual image of this piece is a funeral. The middle section's wild octaves and rapidly climbing and descending arpeggios are filled with exaltation (as the original notes Franz Liszt scripted).

External links 
 

Transcendental 06
1852 compositions
Compositions in G minor